Lawrence Christopher Gonzales (born March 28, 1967, in West Covina, California) is an American former professional baseball player who played one season for the California Angels of Major League Baseball (MLB).

Larry grew up in West Covina (Ca) and attended Edgewood High School where he played football and baseball. He attended the University of Hawaii from 1986 thru 1988. He was a member of the 1987 USA baseball team which won a silver medal in the 1987 Pan American Games.

Larry has worked for Kingston Technology Co. (www.kingston.com) since 1996 where he is currently the Vice President of Administration.

References

1967 births
Living people
American expatriate baseball players in Canada
Arizona League Angels players
Baseball players at the 1987 Pan American Games
Baseball players from California
California Angels players
Edmonton Trappers players
Hawaii Rainbow Warriors baseball players
Major League Baseball catchers
Midland Angels players
Palm Springs Angels players
Pan American Games medalists in baseball
Pan American Games silver medalists for the United States
Sportspeople from West Covina, California
Quad Cities Angels players
Vancouver Canadians players
Medalists at the 1987 Pan American Games
American expatriate baseball players in Australia